Harry Parsons (8 October 1884 – 12 June 1952) was an Australian rules footballer who played with St Kilda in the Victorian Football League (VFL).

Notes

External links 

1884 births
1952 deaths
Australian rules footballers from Victoria (Australia)
St Kilda Football Club players